Shooting at the 2018 Summer Youth Olympics was held from 7 to 12 October. The events took place at the Parque Sarmiento in Buenos Aires, Argentina.

Qualification 

Each National Olympic Committee (NOC) can enter a maximum of 4 athletes, 1 per each event. As hosts, Argentina is given a spot to compete in boys’ 10 m air pistol and girls’ 10 m air rifle events, however they declined to compete in air pistol. A further 24, six per each event will be decided by the Tripartite Commission, though only five were allocated, the remaining will be given out as wild cards. The remaining 54 places shall be decided by qualification events, namely continental qualification tournaments.

To be eligible to participate at the Youth Olympics athletes must have been born between 1 January 2000 and 31 December 2003. Furthermore, all shooters (including hosts and tripartite invitations) must have achieved the following Minimum Qualification Score (MQS).

 Boys 10 m Air Rifle: 60 Shots, Score of 552 / 580.0
 Boys 10 m Air Pistol: 60 Shots, Score of 540
 Girls 10 m Air Rifle: 40 Shots, Score of 368 / 385.0
 Girls 10 m Air Pistol: 40 Shots, Score of 355

The MQS must be achieved between 1 April 2017 and 23 July 2018 at an ISSF registered event.

Summary

10m Air Rifle

10m Air Pistol

 * The quota was reallocated due to no athlete reaching the MQS. It will be given out as a wild card.

Medal summary

Medal table

India were the most successful country in the sports discipline of shooting in 2018 Summer Youth Olympics, as they won a medal in every shooting disciplines they participated. They won a total of 4 medals including 2 golds and 2 silvers.

10m Air Rifle

10m Air Pistol

References

External links
Official Results Book – Shooting

 
2018 Summer Youth Olympics events
Youth Summer Olympics
2018
Shooting competitions in Argentina